In the British Army, Non Regular Permanent Staff (NRPS - often pronounced as Nerps) are members of the Territorial Army who are employed on a full-time basis. They usually fill vital unit administration or quartermaster roles and are most often long-service TA veterans or retired regulars. They hold military rank and wear uniform when appropriate. On 1 April 2003 there were 1,100 NRPS personnel - 300 commissioned officers and 800 other ranks.

In 2010 the NRPS positions were discontinued in favour of TA Home Commitment positions.

Army Reserve (United Kingdom)